Anna Little, Ann Little or Annie Little may refer to:

Ann Little (1891–1984), American actress active 1908 to 1925; billed as Anna Little until 1918
Little Ann Little (1910–1981), American vaudeville actress and dancer; played Betty Boop on radio
Jo Ann Little (born 1953), prisoner who became rallying cry for women's rights

See also
Little Ann, English hamlet in north-west of Hampshire
Little Ann, fictional dog in 1961 book Where the Red Fern Grows
Little (surname)